Stoulton or Stoughton is a village and civil parish about 5 miles south west of Worcester, in the Wychavon district, in the county of Worcestershire, England. The parish includes the hamlet of Hawbridge. In 2011 the parish had a population of 453. The parish touches Norton Juxta Kempsey, Whittington, Peopleton, Drakes Broughton and Wadborough and White Ladies Aston. Many houses in the village date from the 17th century. The scientist and cleric William Derham, the first man to accurately measure the speed of sound, was born in Stoulton in 1657.

Features 
There are 20 listed buildings in Stoulton. Stoulton railway station opened in 1854 and closed in 1966 although it was in the parish of Drakes Broughton and Wadborough. The church is 12th century. Upper Wolverton was a village in the parish that is thought to have been depopulated before 1550, the site currently has 2 farms. Lower Wolverton was possibly also a village in the parish.

History 
The name "Stoulton" means 'Stool farm/settlement'. Stoulton was recorded in the Domesday Book as Stoltun. Stoulton was "Stoltun" in the 9th and 11th centuries, "Stulton" in the 15th century and "Stowton" in the 17th century. On the 25th of March 1885 Cookes Holme was transferred to the parish of Norton Juxta Kempsey. The transferred area contained 1 house in 1891.

References 

Villages in Worcestershire
Civil parishes in Worcestershire
Wychavon